Rama Krishnulu is a 1978 Indian Telugu-language action drama film, produced and directed by V. B. Rajendra Prasad under his Jagapathi Art Pictures banner. It stars N. T. Rama Rao, Akkineni Nageswara Rao, Jayasudha and Jaya Prada, with music composed by K. V. Mahadevan. The film borrows shades of the Hindi film Hera Pheri (1976).

Plot
The film begins with Kondandam a nefarious person who envies a woman Meenakshi for spurning his love and marrying a wise person Ramanandam. So he spills acid into her eyes with his two associates Tyagaraju  & Nagaraju and they also conceal Ramanandam in the dark. Sub-inspector Satyananda a man of righteousness takes up the case and convicts Tyagaraju & Nagaraju. Keeping the grudge, they kill Satyananda's wife Chandramati when their son Ramu witnesses the crime and runs away from home. On his way, he gets acquainted with an orphan Krishna who makes petty thefts to feed his orphanage maintained by a noble person Baba. Even blind Meenakshi, the mother of Krishna hides her identity and stays in the same orphanage. Years roll by, and Ramu joins Krishna, and they become soulmates, bounty hunters, and small-time crooks to nourish the poor. At present, Ramu falls for Lakshmi and Krishna to Jaya. Here Ramu is still longing to avenge the homicide of his mother. Then, Krishna finds out Meenakshi is his mother and learns about the past when Ramu & Krishna realizes that both of them are subjected to the injustice of the same criminals. There onwards, they start eliminating them one after another and are in search of a third heinous Kondandam. During that time, Ramu meets his father Satyanandam but he decides to hold back until he accomplishes his mission. Terror-stricken Kondandam ploys and forges as Krishna's father when war erupts between Ramakrishnulu. At last, it is affirmed that all this is a play to cease Kondandam. Finally, the movie ends on a happy note with the marriages of Ramu & Lakshmi and Krishna & Jaya.

Cast

N. T. Rama Rao as Ramu
Akkineni Nageswara Rao as Krishna
Jaya Prada as Jaya 
Jayasudha as Lakshmi
Satyanarayana as Kondandam
Mohan Babu as Thyagaraju
Allu Ramalingaiah as Jaya's father 
Raja Babu as Jaya's brother
Jaggayya as Sakshala Sub-Inspector Satyanandam
Kanta Rao as Ramanandam
Anjali Devi as Chandramathi
Pushpalatha as Meenakshi
Dhulipala as Baba
Mukkamala as I.G.
K. V. Chalam as Lakshmi's brother
Sarath Babu as Nagaraju
Chalapathi Rao as Jaggu

Soundtrack

Music composed by K. V. Mahadevan. Lyrics were written by Acharya Aatreya.

References

External links 

 

Indian action drama films
Films scored by K. V. Mahadevan
Films directed by V. B. Rajendra Prasad
1970s action drama films
1970s Telugu-language films